The Palpatine family is a fictional dynastic human family in the Star Wars franchise. Within the series, the Palpatines are presented as a bloodline with strong inherent capabilities to the Force, a metaphysical and ubiquitous power to which users can match their personal wills to/exploit to try and bend it toward their destructive desires. The Sith Lord Senator/Chancellor/Galactic Emperor Sheev Palpatine/Darth Sidious is the main antagonist of both the Skywalker Saga and the franchise as a whole; First Order Supreme Leader Snoke (a failed strand-cast clone of Sidious), and the last Jedi Rey (Palpatine's granddaughter) are central characters in the sequel Star Wars film trilogy; of the Palpatine bloodline, Rey's father, Dathan (another failed strand-cast clone of Sidious) is the only member of the family who is not Force-sensitive. Other members of the family outside of the bloodline include Palpatine's adoptive son Gallius Rax, and Dathan's wife and Rey's mother Miramir. The Palpatine bloodline, alongside the Skywalker bloodline, are the two bloodlines that are the strongest with the Force.

History 
In chronological order, one of the Palpatines named Sheev Palpatine first appears in Star Wars: Episode I – The Phantom Menace (1999) as the senator representing Naboo, who is ultimately elected to the role of Chancellor of the Galactic Republic. Unbeknownst to the public, he is the Sith Lord known as Darth Sidious, having an apprentice named Darth Maul.

After Maul's defeat, Sidious takes on another apprentice, Count Dooku (who becomes known as Darth Tyranus), who first appears in Star Wars: Episode II – Attack of the Clones (2002) and later Star Wars: The Clone Wars (both film and television show). Dooku is eventually defeated and killed at the hands of Anakin Skywalker in Star Wars: Episode III – Revenge of the Sith (2005), whom Sidious then manipulates into becoming his new apprentice, known as Darth Vader. After nearly succeeding in orchestrating the annihilation of the Jedi with Order 66, Sidious reorganises the Republic in the First Galactic Empire, of which Sidious (as Palpatine) would serve as the emperor.

During the Imperial Era, Sidious founds the Inquisitorius (kept was under Vader's sharp eye, in Star Wars Rebels and Obi-Wan Kenobi), adopting Jakku orphan Gallius Rax, his intended successor as emperor (appearing in the Aftermath trilogy and Battlefront II), and making a series of failed strand-cast clones of himself, including Snoke (who is later killed by Kylo Ren, born Ben Solo, the grandson of Anakin Skywalker through his daughter, Leia Organa, in the Star Wars sequel trilogy), and Dathan (whom he called his son). Sidious reigns as Galactic Emperor until Return of the Jedi (1983), in which he is killed by the redeemed Anakin Skywalker, who sacrifices himself to save his son, Luke Skywalker, and bring balance to the Force, thus fulfilling the prophecy of the Chosen One.

Sidious eventually resurrects himself into a cloned body of his original body with a ritual known as transference which he learned from his master, Darth Plagueis on the planet called Exegol. However, his immense power causes the body to deteriorate, leading him to seek out a new body to host his spirit. Sidious eventually heals himself by draining his granddaughter, the Jedi Rey (born through Dathan, who escaped Exegol and hid her on Gallius Rax's birth planet Jakku with help from his wife, Miramir) and a redeemed Ben Solo of their combined power called a Force dyad in Star Wars: The Rise of Skywalker (2019). Sidious was then later killed by Rey when she reflected his Force lightning back at him with the Skywalker lightsabers, thus bringing balance back to the Force just as Anakin Skywalker had. However, doing so kills Rey herself, until she is resurrected by Ben, who gives his life for hers. Despite being a Palpatine by blood, Rey takes on the Skywalker surname with the blessing of Luke's and Leia's spirits, who proudly watch in the distance.

Family tree

Members

Sheev Palpatine/Darth Sidious 

Sheev Palpatine, also known as Darth Sidious (portrayed by Ian McDiarmid) is the first known member of the Palpatine family and a powerful Sith Lord formerly under the mastership of Darth Plagueis. Over the course of his lifetime, he takes three Sith apprentices: Darth Maul, Darth Tyranus (Count Dooku), and Darth Vader (Anakin Skywalker), and orchestrates the "clone war" between the Republic and the Separatists, reforming the Republic into the First Galactic Empire in the aftermath, and proclaiming himself emperor. During the Imperial Era, he makes failed strand-cast clones of himself, including Snoke and Dathan, adopts a son, Gallius Rax, and founds the Inquisitorius (kept under Vader's sharp eye). He is eventually killed by Darth Vader, who redeems himself and becomes Anakin Skywalker once again, thus bringing balance to the Force in Return of the Jedi (1983). Sidious ultimately resurrects himself into a cloned body of his original with a ritual known as transference (learned from Plagueis), of which the deterioration he heals himself instead by draining Rey (his granddaughter through Dathan) and Ben Solo (Vader's grandson through Leia Organa) of their combined power, a Force dyad, in Star Wars: The Rise of Skywalker (2019). Sidious is then killed again by Rey when she reflects his Force lightning back at him using the Skywalker lightsabers, thus bringing balance back to the Force just as Anakin Skywalker had.

Snoke 
Snoke (portrayed by Andy Serkis) is a failed strand-cast clone of the Sith Lord Darth Sidious. Created by him after 19 BBY on Exegol to be his puppet ruler, Snoke steals control over the First Order from Rae Sloane as its Supreme Leader on Sidious' behalf, seducing Ben Solo to the dark side of the Force, becoming his master, and turning him into Kylo Ren. Six years later, sensing that there has been an "awakening" in the Force, Snoke tells his apprentice that his limits will be tested when he faces his father, Han Solo, in pursuit of the droid BB-8, who holds a map leading to Ren's uncle, Luke Skywalker. Snoke then orders General Armitage Hux to have the New Republic destroyed by Starkiller Base, before bringing Kylo Ren to him to complete his training. After Snoke bridges Ren's mind with Rey's, he is later killed by his apprentice after Snoke tortures Rey, with Ren slicing Snoke in half horizontally with his grandfather's lightsaber, taking his place as Supreme Leader of the First Order.

Dathan 
Dathan, also known as the Abomination (portrayed by Billy Howle), is a failed strand-cast clone of the Sith Lord Darth Sidious. Created on Exegol during the Imperial Era in 12 BBY, and seen as a son by Sidious, the initially unnamed clone is born without Force-sensitivity and as such rejected, but permitted to live and granted protection from the cultists for his thriving health, by his father. With the help of a Symeong slave named Dathan, the clone escapes Exegol, naming himself after his friend. Dathan later meets and marries a woman named Miramir, who later gives birth to a Force-sensitive daughter in 15 ABY, whom they name Rey. On seeing that his granddaughter's body is the perfect vessel for his spirit, Sidious seeks to track Rey down. Knowing about his father's plan of sending his assassin Ochi of Bestoon to find and bring Rey to Exegol, Dathan and Miramir leave her on the desert planet of Jakku in 21 ABY under the care of Unkar Plutt, before leaving and letting Ochi kill them. Their bodies are later found floating in a box in space by Lando Calrissian and R2-D2, who (with Luke Skywalker and Komat) bury them on the ice planet Neftali.

Rey 
Rey (portrayed by Daisy Ridley) is the granddaughter of Sheev Palpatine/Darth Sidious through Dathan. Born on the planet Hyperkarn in 15 ABY, as a child in 21 ABY, Rey was abandoned by her parents on the planet Jakku to protect her from Sidious. Fourteen years later, Rey meets Kylo Ren (born Ben Solo), with whom she has a connection in the Force, in which they are referred to as a 'Force dyad', and she develops a romantic relationship with him despite the two being enemies at first. She also becomes the last Jedi apprentice of Luke Skywalker and Leia Organa. At the end of Star Wars: The Rise of Skywalker, Rey adopts "Skywalker" as her surname (having considered the Skywalkers her true family) despite not being part of the Skywalker bloodline; until then having been mononymous. With the deaths of everyone in Anakin's bloodline, she is currently the only living person known to bear the Skywalker name.

Extended family of the Palpatines

Gallius Rax 
Gallius Rax, born Galli and introduced as the Operator (voiced by Sam Witwer), is an adoptive son of Galactic Emperor Sheev Palpatine/Darth Sidious. Born on Jakku in c. 42 BBY, he overlooks an ancient Sith temple on his father's behalf before entering a career in the Imperial navy, quickly rising through the ranks and becoming known as the "Emperor's Will". Following his father's first death, Rax assumes control of the Empire, using would-be Imperial reformist Rae Sloane as a puppet ruler before betraying her as a patsy, facing off against the forces of the New Republic. While secretly heading up Operation: Cinder, planning on blowing up his native planet during the Battle of Jakku, destroying both the New Republic fleet and present Imperial forces before fleeing to meet his father in the Unknown Regions and rebuild the Empire, Rax's plans are foiled by Sloane, having teamed up with Republic operative Lore Wexley and his wife Norra to infiltrate his ship, before Rax is fatally shot in the stomach by Sloane. With his dying breath, Rax requests that Sloane take his forces with Brendol Hux to the Unknown Regions to assume control of the Empire, appealing to her patriotism and wish for Imperial reform. While Sloane ultimately does so, reforming the Empire into a more peaceful "first order", control over these forces are seized from her by Snoke, on behalf of the resurrected Sidious. Sometime later, Rax's corpse and Super Star Destroyer are scavenged by his unknowing niece Rey, abandoned on Jakku.

Miramir 
Miramir (portrayed by Jodie Comer) is the mother of Rey and wife of Dathan, born on the planet Hyperkarn in 6 BBY. During her youth, she lives on Hyperkarn with her grandmother (with whom she was very close), becoming an engineer and pilot. Miramir later meets and marries the clone-son of Sheev Palpatine/Darth Sidious, named Dathan, and gives birth to a Force-sensitive daughter in 15 ABY, whom they name Rey. In 21 ABY, Miramir and her husband abandon their daughter on the desert planet of Jakku under the care of Unkar Plutt, before leaving so Sidious's assassin, Ochi of Bestoon will not find her and bring her to Exegol to serve as a vessel for her grandfather's spirit, before being murdered by Ochi, with their bodies put in a crate and left it floating in space, before being found by Lando Calrissian and R2-D2, who (with Luke Skywalker and Komat) bury their bodies on the ice planet Neftali.

Miramir's Grandmother 
The matriarch of Miramir's family, known as Miramir's Grandmother and Rey's Great-Grandmother, raises her granddaughter on Hyperkarn to eventually become an engineer and pilot.

Legends 

|-
|style="text-align: left;"|Notes:

Cosinga Palpatine 
Cosinga Palpatine is an aristocrat and the patriarch of the Palpatine family. A violent man regarded by his firstborn child as both grossly inept disproportionately and arrogant, Cosinga spends a considerable amount of time and credits attempting to collect political influence and his son's obedience.

Out of a minimum of five children that he and his wife produce, Cosinga despises his eldest child, but accepts his other two sons and two daughters. Unlike their father's wayward heir, the younger Palpatines are subservient to Cosinga's will; something that their older brother refuses to be. Ultimately, the younger Palpatine ends his father in an act of rage in 65 BBY, using the dark side of the Force to kill him along with the rest of his family and several of his family's bodyguards. This Palpatine soon becomes Darth Sidious, Dark Lord of the Sith, and later Senator, Supreme Chancellor, and Emperor.

Triclops 

Triclops is a white-haired human mutant slave and the son of Emperor Palpatine with Sly Moore. He has three eyes (one being in the back of his head) and sports scars on his temples from electroshocks administered by the Galactic Empire. 

After failing training to become an Emperor's Eye, the Emperor comes to consider his son one of his greatest failures, and has him put in prison. After languishing for years in an Imperial Prison on Kessel, fathering a son named Ken, with a former Jedi named Kendalina, Triclops eventually escapes from the clutches of the Empire and, rebelling against his father, joins the Rebel Alliance with his son before disappearing from the galaxy forever.

Ken 

Ken is the son of Triclops and a "Jedi Princess" named Kendalina, therefore the paternal grandson of Emperor Palpatine and a "Jedi Prince." After joining the Rebel Alliance with his father, he disappears from the galaxy forever.

Extended family of the Palpatines

Sly Moore 

Sly Moore is Palpatine's assistant and ultimate consort, bearing his mutant son Triclops, to whom is also born Palpatine's and Moore's grandson, Ken.

Kendalina 
Kendalina is a "Jedi Princess" and wife of Palpatine's son Triclops, with whom she has a son, the "Jedi Prince" Ken.

Notes

References

External links 
 

Characters created by George Lucas

Fictional families
Fictional family trees
Fictional elements introduced in 1999